Robert Morse (1931-2022) was an American actor and singer.

Robert Morse may also refer to:
 Robert S. Morse (1924–2015), American bishop
 Robert W. Morse (1921–2001), American academic and administrator
 Robert Morse Crunden (1940–1999), American historian
 Bob Morse (born 1951), American basketball player

See also 
 Robert Morss Lovett (1870–1956), American academic